The Pendragon Legend (Hungarian: A Pendragon legenda) is a 1974 Hungarian thriller film directed by György Révész and starring Zoltán Latinovits, Iván Darvas and Teri Tordai. It is based on the 1934 novel The Pendragon Legend by Antal Szerb.

Cast
 Zoltán Latinovits - Dr. Bátky János 
 Iván Darvas - Earl of Gwynedd 
 Teri Tordai - Eileen St. Claire 
 Marianna Moór - Lene Kretzsch 
 Béla Timár - Osborne Pendragon 
 Judit Halász - Cynthia Pendragon 
 Ferenc Kállai - Dr. Rehmer / Reverend 
 István Bujtor - George Maloney 
 Tamás Major - James Morvin 
 Nóra Tábori - Mrs. Burt / Psychic 
 Ila Schütz - Jenny 
 Cecília Esztergályos - Pat O'Brian 
 László Kozák - John Griffith 
 Erzsi Simor - Lady Malmsbury Croft 
 Márta Bakó - Bolond öregasszony

External links

1974 films
Hungarian thriller films
1970s Hungarian-language films
Hungarian satirical films
Films based on Hungarian novels
Films set in London
Films set in England
1970s thriller films